The 31e Escadre Aérienne de Ravitaillement et de Transport Stratégiques (31st Strategic Airlift and Air Refueling Wing) is an air refueling and transport unit of the French Air and Space Force (Armée de l'air et de l'espace) activated on August 27, 2014 at Istres-Le Tubé Air Base. The wing's air refueling squadron is equipped with the French C-135FR model of the Boeing KC-135 Stratotanker.

The wing's squadrons include:
 Escadron de Ravitaillement en Vol 4/31 Sologne Air Refueling Squadron
 Escadron de Ravitaillement en Vol et de Transport Stratégiques 1/31 Bretagne Strategic Air-to-Air Refuelling and Transport Squadron
 Escadron de Soutien Technique Spécialisé 15/93 Specialised Technical Support Squadron
 Escadron de Soutien Technique Aéronautique 15/31 Camargue Aeronautical Technical Support Squadron
 Escadron d'armement Spécialisé 66/31 Méditerranéé Specialised Arms Squadron

Commanding officers
Lieutenant-colonel Olivier Roquefeuil (27 August 2014 – 8 July 2015)
Lieutenant-colonel Marc Alligier (8 July 2015 – present)

References

Military units and formations of the French Air and Space Force
Air force transport units and formations
Military units and formations established in 2014